Distinguish the Ilwana dialect of Konongo.

Ilwana (Kiwilwana), or Malakote, is a minor Bantu language of Kenya.

References

Languages of Kenya
Northeast Coast Bantu languages